The Harris-Borman House, a Queen Anne-style house at 827 Mechanic in Emporia, Kansas, was built in 1897.  It was listed on the National Register of Historic Places in 1992.

It was deemed notable "for its architectural significance as a transitional, Queen Anne residence." It was constructed by Linley M. Harris (1835-1924), a contractor and carpenter, as his home.

References

Houses on the National Register of Historic Places in Kansas
Queen Anne architecture in Kansas
Houses completed in 1897
Lyon County, Kansas